Best Ed is a Canadian animated television series created by Rick Marshall. The show chronicles the adventures of an excessively helpful and enthusiastic dog named Ed and his best friend, Doug the squirrel and soldier, whom everyone calls "Buddy" because Ed refers to him as best buddy. They live in their fictional hometown of Swellville. Best Ed is produced by 9 Story Entertainment and animated using Adobe Flash software.

The fifth episode premiered on October 3, 2008, on Teletoon as a sneak preview. However, subsequent episodes were only shown beginning October 5, 2009. The series ended on October 22, 2009. 26 episodes were produced.

Overview
The show follows two anthropomorphic animals, Ed and Buddy, a dog and a squirrel respectively, who live in the town of Swellville (parody of Snellville) in Canada. Their adventures and sometimes misadventures usually cause them to interact with other characters. While Ed is well-liked by all, and extremely lucky, Buddy is furiously despised, and extremely unfortunate, gratuitously so.

Characters

Main

 Ed (voiced by Sean Cullen) – A yellow dog. Ed is overenthusiastic and helpful, but rather dimwitted. He has many catchphrases, such as his trademark 'Yee!' and 'I'm here to help!', as well as 'Sacagawea!', 'Krakatoa!' and 'Well isn't that curious?' He has a speech impediment which makes him often say 'sh' rather than 's'. He has 'happy sandals', and is a frequent viewer of The Mighty Measel Moles, a Star Trek parody, both of which Buddy hates. He has numerous skills. Much focus is drawn to his belly button. He is well liked by everyone in the neighbourhood, although he considers Buddy his best friend.
 Buddy AKA Doug (voiced by Pat McKenna) – An orange squirrel. Buddy is more level-headed and intelligent than Ed. He suffers incredibly from the antics of Ed, and everyone else (through either neglect or abuse), and only ends the episode happily in only a few episodes. He still does consider himself good friends with Ed. Everyone else dislikes him. He enjoys nuts, and has a car with a giant acorn for a roof. He was part of a club devoted to the nerdy role playing game Battle Buddies awhile ago. His catchphrases are "Oh no, please no!" and 'It's Doug, actually'.

Recurring

 Mr. Thursty (Thurston Plumtickler III) (voiced by Kedar Brown) – A large, brown dog. Mr. Thursty is paranoid and aggressive. His sidekick is Eugene. He speaks with a US Black accent. He is very jealous of Buddy.
 Miss Fluffé (voiced by Carolyn Scott) – A yellow hamster. Miss Fluffé resembles the stereotypical fortune teller, but this is not an often employed trait. She has a crush on Ed.
 The Kitten Twins (Betsy voiced by Sarah Commisso and Buster voiced by Tessa Marshall) – Pink cats. Betsy and Buster appear cute and innocent, but are the worst of the lot. They tend to speak at the same time and giggle a lot. They are very rich, due to their high paying jobs as top mitten testers. They ride unicycles, as shown in the episode.
 Dr. Quacken (voiced by Jamie Watson) – A tall, green duck who wears glasses and a white jacket. He is Ed and Buddy's family doctor. Whenever he gives Buddy the bill, he uses "duck bill humor". He loves playing golf, and doesn't know what club to use on the ninth hole.
 Eugene Tuttle – A short, green turtle. Eugene is frequently picked on by Mr. Thursty. He lives in a house shaped liked a shell, surrounded by a moat. He is the only reptile in the neighbourhood. Despite being present in the theme song, he appears infrequently compared to everybody else in the neighbourhood, and is shy and nervous. He has never been mean to Buddy yet.
 Heiny (voiced by Damon Papadopoulos) – A Scottish Terrier who wears a kilt and has a Scottish accent who is a crossing guard. Heiny appears to have a temper as he is yelling most of the time.
 Whitey, Blacky and Red – Three squirrels and brothers who attended the same college as Buddy. The group hosts annual Battle Buddy Weekends with Buddy.

Episodes
Pilot. "Fat Chance" (2006 Animated Short)

 "Rub My Ed for Luck"/"Best Ediquette"
 "Crossing Dogs"/"Squeals on the Bus"
 "Smarti Pants"/"Sock It to Him"
 "Driver's Ed"/"Go Cart Go"
 "Nightmare on Sweet Street"/"Cat Fright"
 "Ed and Breakfast"/"Tooth or Consequences"
 "Lost in Place"/"Scouts Dishonour"
 "Chinese Please"/"The Unhappy Sandals"
 "Perfect-O"/"Sleep Wrecker"
 "The Night Before Hoppenscotch"/"Yeederhosers"
 "My Fair Laddies"/"Confined to Ed"
 "Local Zeroes"/"Outside Inmates"
 "Yee for a Life"/"The Mighty Measle Role"
 "Follow the Yeeder"/"Come Fly with Yee"
 "Paws for Alarm"/"Send in the Klownmans"
 "Chamele-Ed"/"Camp Camaraderie"
 "Squirrels Gone Wild"/"Ed Waiter"
 "Missing Mittens Mission"/"Talking Ed"
 "Lost Ed Found"/"Peddle Me Nuts"
 "Aye Robots"/"Where No Buddy Has Gone Before"
 "Uncommon Scents"/"A Pox on Thee Now"
 "No Buddy's Hero"/"An Arm-Yee of One"
 "Memor-Yee Loss/"Long Bark of the Law"
 "Ed for Sale"/"Rope-a-Dopes"
 "Help Want-Ed"/"Screaming Yee-Bees"
 "King Mr. Tut's Nut"/"Gym-Dandy"

Broadcast and home media
In Canada, the show first aired on Teletoon with the final episode ended in October 22, 2010. It currently airs on Toon-A-Vision.

In foreign countries, the show was also aired on Boomerang and Cartoon Network in the United Kingdom, and ABC Me in Australia.

As of 2022, the show is now streaming on Tubi in the United States.

Madman Entertainment released one volume of "Best Ed" on DVD in Australia on August 18, 2012. The DVD contained four episodes with sixteen segments.

References

External links
 
 

2000s Canadian animated television series
2008 Canadian television series debuts
2009 Canadian television series endings
Canadian children's animated comedy television series
Canadian flash animated television series
Animated television series about dogs
Television series by 9 Story Media Group
Animated television series about squirrels
Teletoon original programming
Cartoon Network original programming
Television shows filmed in Toronto
English-language television shows